The National Film Award for Best Film on Environment Conservation/Preservation is one of the categories in the National Film Awards presented annually by the Directorate of Film Festivals, the organization set up by the Ministry of Information and Broadcasting in India. It is one of several awards presented for feature films and awarded with Rajat Kamal (Silver Lotus).

The National Film Awards were established in 1954 to "encourage production of the films of a high aesthetic and technical standard and educational and culture value" and also planned to included awards for regional films. In 1989, at the 37th National Film Awards the new category of award for Best Film on Environment Conservation/Preservation was introduced for the Rajat Kamal and awarded annually for films produced in the year across the country, in all Indian languages.  since its inception, the award has been present only nineteen times to unique films. It has been presented for films in eight languages with the highest being six in Malayalam, followed by five in Kannada, two each in Assamese and Odia, and one each in Bodo, Manipuri, Marathi, and Tamil. It was not presented on nine occasion in 1990 (38th ceremony), 1991 (39th ceremony), 1996 (44th ceremony), 2001 (49th ceremony), 2002 (50th ceremony), 2006 (54th ceremony), 2007 (55th ceremony), 2009 (57th ceremony), and 2011 (59th ceremony).

The inaugural award was conferred upon the production house M/s Purbanchal Film Co-operative Society Ltd. (Rajat Kamal and  30,000) and director Jahnu Barua (Rajat Kamal and  15,000) for their Assamese film Bonani for the story of a lone forest officer fighting the illegal timber mafia and protecting rights of uneducated tribals. Kannada film director P. Sheshadri received the award in 2005 for his film Thutturi which was produced by Jayamala Ramchandra. He again won the award in 2010 for the film Bettada Jeeva produced by Basanta Kumar Patil. Malayalam film director Dr. Biju went on to receive the award in 2013 for his film Perariyathavar produced by Ambalakkara Global Films and again in 2015 for the film Valiya Chirakulla Pakshikal produced by A. K. Pillai. The most recent recipient of the award has been the Monpa film Water Burial.

Winners 
The award includes 'Rajat Kamal' (Silver Lotus) and cash prize to the producers and director each. The first award in 1989 had a monetary association of  30,000 to the producers and  15,000 to the directors. In 1995 at the 43rd award ceremony the Bodo language film Rape in the Virgin Forest was honoured and the cash prices were revised to  30,000 each presented to Jwngdao Bodosa who had both produced and directed the film about the problems of deforestation and struggles of tribal people. The monetary association was again revised to   1,50,000 to both the producers and directors in 2008 at the 56th awarding ceremony where producer Akshay Parija and director Prashanta Nanda's Odia language film Jianta Bhoota (meaning "The Living Ghost") was the winner for its portrayal of lives of Dongria Kondh tribal people residing in the Niyamgiri hills range of Odisha.

Following are the award winners over the years:

References

External links 
 Official Page for Directorate of Film Festivals, India
 National Film Awards Archives
 National Film Awards at IMDb

Environment Conservation Preservation